The 2014 United States House of Representatives elections in Oregon were held on Tuesday, November 4, 2014 to elect the five U.S. representatives from the state of Oregon, one from each of the state's five congressional districts. The elections coincided with the elections of other federal and state offices, including the Governor of Oregon and a United States Senator. Primary elections were held on May 20, 2014.

Overview

By district
Results of the 2014 United States House of Representatives elections in Oregon by district:

District 1

The 1st district is located in the northwest corner of Oregon. The incumbent is Democrat Suzanne Bonamici, who has represented the district since winning a special election in 2012. She was re-elected with 60% of the vote in 2012 and the district has a PVI of D+7.

Democratic primary

Candidates
 Suzanne Bonamici, incumbent U.S. Representative (unopposed)

Results

Republican primary

Candidates
 Delinda Delgado Morgan, heavy-equipment operator, winemaker and martial arts instructor
 Bob Niemeyer, mechanical engineer
 Jason Yates, pest control service manager

Results

General election

Results

District 2

The 2nd district is located east of the Willamette Valley and covers roughly two-thirds of the state. It is the largest of Oregon's five districts and is the seventh-largest district in the nation. The incumbent is Republican Greg Walden, the Chairman of the National Republican Congressional Committee, who has represented the district since 1999. He was re-elected with 69% of the vote in 2012 and the district has a PVI of R+10.

Republican primary
The Club for Growth targeted Walden for a primary challenge.

Candidates
 Dennis Linthicum, Klamath County Commissioner
 Greg Walden, incumbent U.S. Representative

Results

Democratic primary

Candidates
 Aelea Christofferson, business owner
 Barney Spera, retired United States Marine and union president
 C. F. Vulliet, attorney and writer

Results

General election

Results

District 3

The 3rd district most of Multnomah County, including Portland east of the Willamette River, Gresham and Troutdale. The incumbent is Democrat Earl Blumenauer, who has represented the district since 1996. He was re-elected with 75% of the vote in 2012 and the district has a PVI of D+22.

Democratic primary

Candidates
 Earl Blumenauer, incumbent U.S. Representative (unopposed)

Results

Republican primary

Candidates
 James Buchal, attorney (unopposed)

Results

General election

Results

District 4

The 4th district the southern half of Oregon's coastal counties, including Coos, Curry, Douglas, Lane and Linn counties and most of Benton and Josephine counties. The incumbent is Democrat Peter DeFazio, who has represented the district since 1987. He was re-elected with 59% of the vote in 2012 and the district has a PVI of D+2.

Democratic primary

Candidates
 Peter DeFazio, incumbent U.S. Representative (unopposed)

Results

Republican primary

Candidates
 Arthur B. Robinson, chemist, Chairman of the Oregon Republican Party and nominee for the seat in 2010 and 2012 (unopposed)

Results

General election

Results

District 5

The 5th district includes Oregon's central coast through Salem, north to the southern Portland suburbs and east to the summit of Mount Hood. The incumbent is Democrat Kurt Schrader, who has represented the district since 2009. He was re-elected with 54% of the vote in 2012 and the district has an even PVI.

Democratic primary

Candidates
 Anita Brown, former U.S. Army medical specialist and retired union worker
 Kurt Schrader, incumbent U.S. Representative

Results

Republican primary

Candidates
 Ben Pollock, former Congressional aide and businessman
 Tootie Smith, Clackamas County Commissioner

Results

General election

Results

See also
 2014 United States House of Representatives elections
 2014 Oregon elections
 2014 United States Senate election in Oregon
 2014 Oregon gubernatorial election

References

External links
U.S. House elections in Oregon, 2014 at Ballotpedia
Campaign contributions at OpenSecrets

Oregon
2014
House